The western white-eared giant rat (Hyomys dammermani) is a species of rodent in the family Muridae.
It is found in West Papua, Indonesia and Papua New Guinea.

References

Rodents of Papua New Guinea
Hyomys
Mammals of Western New Guinea
Mammals described in 1933
Taxonomy articles created by Polbot
Taxa named by Georg Hermann Wilhelm Stein
Rodents of New Guinea